Bighead goby may refer to:

Drombus globiceps, also known as the Kranji drombus, a species of goby from the western Indo-Pacific
Ponticola kessleri, also known as Kessler's goby, a species of goby native to Eurasia

Fish common names